Vicky Hernández is a Colombian movie, theater and TV actress.

Work

Film
2016 Between Sea and Land
2005 Les Gens Honnêtes Vivent en France (Soeur Suzanna)
2004 Perder es Cuestión de Método, de Sergio Cabrera
2004 El Cristo de Plata
2000 Proof of Life, de Taylor Hackford - prod. estadounidense (María)
1999 La Toma de la Embajada, de Ciro Durán (María Elena Chassoul)
1997 La Deuda, de Manuel José Álvarez y Nicolás Buenaventura
Paradiso del Trópico, de Cristián Norbert y Françoise Bricaut - prod. francesa
1994 Águilas no Cazan Moscas, de Sergio Cabrera (Encarnación)
1993 La Estrategia del Caracol, de Sergio Cabrera (Doña Eulalia)
1990 Confesión a Laura, de Jaime Osorio Gómez (Laura)
1988 Técnicas de Duelo, de Sergio Cabrera (Encarnación)
1987 Chronicle of a Death Foretold (Crónica de una Muerte Anunciada), de Francesco Rosi (Clotilde Armenta)
1986 Visa U.S.A., de Lisandro Duque (madre de Patricia)
1986 La Mansión de Araucaima, de Carlos Mayolo (La Machiche)
1985 Póngale Color, de Camila Loboguerrero - mediometraje
1984 Cóndores no Entierran Todos los Días, de Francisco Norden (Agripina)
1984 Caín, de Gustavo Nieto Roa
1984 Nelly, de Teresa Saldarriaga - mediometraje
1983 Carne de tu Carne, de Carlos Mayolo
1982 Le Sang des Tropiques, de Cristhian Bricault - prod. francesa
1981 Las Cuatro Edades del Amor, de Mario Mitrotti
1980 Caperucita Roja, de Humberto Coral - mediometraje

Theater
Águilas no cazan moscas (1994) .... Encarnación
La casita del placer (1994 - teatro)
Estrategia del caracol, La (1993) .... Doña Eulalia, the pious murderess
La muerte y la doncella (1992 - teatro)
Prisioneros del amor
La muerte y la doncella, teatro dirigido por Fanny Mikey
"Hilos invisibles"
Confesión a Laura (1991) .... Laura
Cartas de amor (1991 - teatro)
"Azúcar" (1989) TV Series .... Raquel Vallecilla
"Romeo y Buseta" (Seriado) ....  doña Amparo Tuta
Técnicas de duelo: Una cuestión de honor (1988) .... Encarnación
Matter of Honour, A (1988) (UK)
Hay que deshacer la casa (1987 - teatro)
Mansión de Araucaima, La (1986) .... La Machiche
Debajo de las estrellas (mediometraje) (1986)
+Visa USA (1986) .... Patricia's mother
Póngale color (1985)
Cóndores no entierran todos los días (1984) .... Agripina
Nelly (1984)
Carne de tu carne (1983)
Sang des tropiques, Le (1982)
I took Panama (1980 - teatro)
El resistible ascenso de Arturo Ui (1979 - teatro)
Ricardo III (1978 - teatro)
Rubí (1970)
Soldados (1966 - teatro)
Variaciones sobre un tema de Kafka (1966 - teatro)
La gaviota (1966 - teatro)
Cascabel
Proof of life
Las cuatro edades del amor
Espumas (1991)
Casa Brava
Reina de belleza
El Faraón
Don Chinche (seriado)
"La intrusa" .... La Mona Nancy (premio India Catalina)
Los colores de la fama
"Inseparables"
"La casa de las dos palmas" (premio India Catalina y Simón Bolívar) * (1991)
"Pasiones secretas"
Cuentos y leyendas
Dialogando
El coleccionista
Un travía llamado deseo
Los siete pecados capitales
Casa de muñecas
Marat Sade
El burgues geltilhombre
Telediacto
Historia de los grandes hombres
Retablo de la avaricia, la lujuria y la muerte
El mundo del niño
Abrete sésamo
Música para niño

Television

Sin senos sí hay paraíso (2016 - )
Hasta que la plata nos separe (2006-2007)
Juan Sin Miedo
Las noches luciana
Siete Veces amada
La Casa de las Dos Palmas
El Fiscal
Azucar (1989)
Pandillas: Guerra y Paz
En los Tacones de Eva
Hasta que la Plata nos Separe
Aqui no hay quien viva (2008)
Tiempo Final (2007, Fox TeleColombia)
Madre.La (1998)
Momposina (1995)
Sobrevivir (1995)

References

External links
 

Colombian film actresses
Living people
Colombian stage actresses
Colombian television actresses
20th-century Colombian actresses
Year of birth missing (living people)